Sakar, Turkmenistan  is a city in Saýat District, Lebap Province, Turkmenistan.  It was upgraded to city status on 27 July 2016 by Parliamentary Resolution No. 425-V.

Etymology
Sakar is the name of a minor Turkmen tribe. The meaning is obscure.

References

Populated places in Lebap Region